Petro is a masculine given name, a surname and an Ancient Roman cognomen. It may refer to:

Given name
 Petro Balabuyev (1931–2007), Ukrainian airplane designer, engineer and professor, lead designer of many Antonov airplanes
 Petro Doroshenko (1627–1698), Cossack political and military leader, Hetman of Right-bank Ukraine (1665–1672) and a Russian voyevoda (governor)
 Petro Drevchenko (1863–1934), Ukrainian bandurist
 Petro Dyachenko (1895–1965), Ukrainian military commander
 Petro Dyminskyi (born 1954), Ukrainian politician, businessman and former footballer
 Petro Franko (1890–1941), Ukrainian educator and author
 Petro Georgiou (born 1947), Australian politician
 Petro Goga, Chairman of the Constituent Assembly of Albania in 1924
 Petro Hermanchuk (1952–2012), Ukranian economist and politician
 Petro Kalnyshevsky (1691?–1803), last Koshovyi Otaman of the Zaporozhian Host (in what is now Ukraine)
 Petro Kharchenko (born 1983), Ukrainian former pair ice skater
 Petro Kasui Kibe (1587–1639), Japanese Christian missionary, Jesuit priest and martyr
 Petro Konashevych-Sahaidachny (1570-1622), political and civic leader
 Petro Kondratyuk (born 1979), Ukrainian former footballer
 Petro Korol (1941–2015), Ukrainian weightlifter and 1976 Olympic champion
 Petro Nini Luarasi (1864-1911), Albanian nationalist, Christian orthodox priest, teacher and journalist
 Petro Herkulan Malchuk (1965-2016), Ukrainian Roman Catholic Archbishop of Kyiv-Zhytomyr
 Petro Marko (1913–1991), Albanian writer
 Petro Mirchuk (1913–1999), Ukrainian writer
 Petro Nishchynsky (1832–1896), Ukrainian linguist and composer
 Petro Pakhnyuk (born 1991), Ukrainian (until 2014) and Azerbaijani (since 2014) artistic gymnast
 Petro Pereverza (born 1994), Ukrainian footballer
 Petro Poga (1850-1944), Albanian nationalist, one of the delegates at the Albanian Declaration of Independence
 Petro Poroshenko (born 1965), Ukrainian businessman and politician
 Petro Prokopovych (1775–1850), the founder of commercial beekeeping
 Petro Shelest (1908–1996), First Secretary of the Communist party in the Ukrainian Soviet Socialist Republic and member of the Politburo of the Communist Party of the Soviet Union
 Petro Slobodyan (born 1953), Soviet retired footballer and current Ukrainian coach
 Petro Symonenko (born 1952), Ukrainian politician and First Secretary of the Central Committee of the Communist Party of Ukraine
 Petro Tkachenko (1878-1919), Ukrainian blind kobzar (musician)
 Petro Trad (1876–1947), Lebanese lawyer, politician and briefly President of the French Mandate of Lebanon in 1943
 Petro Trochanowski (born 1947), Polish poet
 Petro Vlahos (1916–2013), Hollywood special effects pioneer
 Petro Voinovsky (1913—1996), Ukrainian nationalist
 Petro Zakhvalynsky (died 1943), Ukrainian nationalist

Surname
 Gustavo Petro (born 1960), Colombian politician and economist
 Jim Petro (born 1948), American politician and former Ohio Attorney General
 Johan Petro (born 1986), French professional basketball player
 Joe Petro III (born 1956), American artist
 Joseph Petro (born 1944), former United States Secret Service agent, Executive Vice President and Managing Director of Citigroup Security and Investigative Services
 Pamela Petro, American artist

 Nicolai N. Petro, American political science scholar
 Steve Petro (1914–1994), American National Football League player

Cognomen
 Titus Flavius Petro (fl. 1st century BC), paternal grandfather of the Roman Emperor Vespasian

Other
 Petro (cryptocurrency), Venezuelan cryptocurrency
 Petro lwa or Petwo, a family of lwa (loa) in Voudon (Voodoo)
 Petros (disambiguation)
 Petroleum

Masculine given names
Ukrainian masculine given names